Todd-AO is an American post-production company founded in 1953 by Mike Todd and Robert Naify, providing sound-related services to the motion picture and television industries. For more than five decades, it was the worldwide leader in theater sound. The company now operates one facility in the Los Angeles area. 

Todd-AO is also the name of the widescreen, 70 mm film format that was developed by Mike Todd and the Naify brothers, owners of United Artists Theaters in partnership with the American Optical Company in the mid-1950s. Todd-AO had been founded to promote and distribute this system.

History
Todd-AO began as a high resolution widescreen film format. It was co-developed in the early 1950s by Mike Todd, a Broadway producer, and United Artists Theaters in partnership with the American Optical Company in Buffalo, New York. It was developed to provide a high definition single camera widescreen process to compete with Cinerama, or as characterized by its creator, "Cinerama outta one hole". Where Cinerama used a complicated setup of three separate strips of film photographed simultaneously, Todd-AO required only a single camera and lens.

The company's focus began to shift after Mike Todd's sudden death in an airplane accident in 1958. The 70 mm Todd-AO process was adopted by Panavision, Cinerama and others. As the production and exhibition markets became saturated with Todd-AO System hardware, the focus of the company gradually began to narrow down to the audio post-production side of the business, and Todd-AO became an independent sound mixing facility for commercial motion picture films and television after acquiring Glen Glenn Sound in 1986.

In May 2014, Todd-AO's parent company, Todd Soundelux, filed for Chapter 11 bankruptcy protection. As part of the bankruptcy proceedings, the company closed its Hollywood and Santa Monica facilities, leaving only their Burbank location operational.

On November 17, 2014, Sounddogs acquired the Todd-Soundelux Trademarks (Todd AO and Soundelux) and Copyrights (Sound Effects Library) through Federal Bankruptcy Court (Central District Case No. 2:14-bk-19980)

Todd-AO process  

The Todd-AO process uses two separate film stocks; a 65 mm negative is used during production and then used to produce the 70 mm positives for distribution. The sprocket holes perforations on the two are the same, and the positives are printed using contact printing with the negatives centered on the larger 70 mm film. Contact printing was used on prints that were to be "double system," using a separate, synchronized 35 mm full-coat magnetic film for the 6 sound tracks, in addition to the 70 mm film for the picture.  The much more common 70 mm release prints used a slightly optically reduced picture, and placed four of the soundtracks on either edge outside of the perforations, and two more soundtracks inside the perforations, providing a total of six soundtracks, on a 7.5 mm magnetic surface. It is a common error to suppose that only 5 mm of space  was devoted to the soundtracks, perhaps because writers do the math and find that 70 - 65 = 5, not allowing for a slightly reduced picture area to accommodate two tracks inside the sprocket holes, as well as four outside, and perhaps because the souvenir program for Around the World in Eighty Days made the same error. Anyone with a release print in front of them would immediately see the tracks between the picture and the holes, as well as the wider tracks (to hold two tracks each) outside the holes. They can be seen in Figure 1 of this article, above the caption "positive 70 mm". Todd-AO soundtracks were very high fidelity, and could still compete with modern digital tracks above 40 kHz. Even though there were no subwoofers in theaters in those days, Todd-AO delivered high-impact bass using crisp-sounding horn-loaded speakers. Four lens options covered a 128, 64, 48 or 37 degree field of view. The aspect ratio of this format was 2.20:1.

Both film sizes had been used in the past, in the 70 mm Fox Grandeur process in 1929–1930, however Todd-AO's physical format was not compatible with this format. The use of 65 mm photography and 70 mm printing became the standard adopted by others: Super Panavision 70 (essentially the Panavision company's version of Todd-AO) and Ultra Panavision 70 (the same mechanically, but with a slight 1.25:1 anamorphic squeeze to accommodate extremely wide aspect ratio images) are both 65/70 processes. The Soviet film industry also copied Todd-AO with their own Sovscope 70 process, identical, except that both the camera and print stock were 70 mm wide.

The IMAX format also uses 65 mm camera and lab film to create 70 mm prints for projection (also known as the 65/70 mm process); conforming to the pitch and perforation standard for 70 mm Todd-AO film. However, the IMAX frame is 15-perfs long and runs horizontally through the projector, whereas the Todd-AO frame is only 5-perfs high and runs vertically through the projector.

The original version of the Todd-AO process used a frame rate of 30 frames per second, faster than the 24 frames per second that was (and is) the standard. The difference does not seem great, but the sensitivity of the human eye to flickering declines steeply with frame rate and the small adjustment gave the film noticeably less flicker, and made it steadier and smoother than standard processes. The original system generated an image that was "almost twice as intense as any ever seen onscreen before, and so hot that the film has to be cooled as it passes through the Todd-AO projector".

Only the first two Todd-AO films, Oklahoma! and Around the World in Eighty Days, employed 30 frames per second photography. Because of the need for conventional versions at 24 frames per second, every scene of the former film was shot twice in succession: once in Todd-AO and once in 35 mm CinemaScope. The latter film was shot with two 65 mm Todd-AO cameras simultaneously, the speed of the second camera was 24 frames per second for wide release as optical reduction prints. All subsequent Todd-AO films were shot at 24 frames per second on a 65 mm negative and optically printed to 35 mm film as needed for standard distribution.  In all, around 16 feature films were shot in Todd-AO.

Todd-AO was developed and tested in Buffalo, New York at the Regent Theatre. Richard Rodgers and Oscar Hammerstein II went there to see Todd-AO test footage, which led them to approve its use for Oklahoma!. Ampex Corporation engineers were in charge of developing the Todd-AO sound system. Ampex would later go on to manufacture the sound system, including selectable four-track composite (CinemaScope), six-track composite (Todd-AO), four-track interlocked, six-track interlocked or optical sound sources.

The Todd-AO Company also offered a 35 mm anamorphic process technically similar to 35 mm Panavision or CinemaScope. This may cause some confusion if a Todd-AO credit (not necessarily the more specific Todd-AO 35 credit) appears in some widescreen films made in the 1970s and 1980s. It becomes even more confusing as 70 mm prints were made for films which, unlike earlier pictures made in the process, were shown in multiplexes, like Dune and Logan's Run.

During the late 1970s through the early 1990s 65 mm photography such as that used in processes like Todd-AO or Super Panavision became rare. However, some major films had 70 mm prints made by blowup from 35 mm negatives mostly for the benefit of six-track sound. These prints would typically play only in a few theatres in a few large cities while everyone else viewed the film in 35 mm. The advent of multichannel digital sound in the 1990s obviated these very expensive prints. "Blow-up" 70 mm prints also followed the Todd-AO layout, although in the case of films made with a 1.85:1 aspect ratio, it was retained in the 70 mm version, with the sides of the 70 mm frame left black.

Curved screen vs. flat
While Todd-AO was intended to be "Cinerama out of one hole", the extreme wide-angle photography and projection onto a very deeply curved screen (which is what that would imply) saw little use. Most Todd-AO theatre installations had only moderately curved screens and the extreme wide-angle camera lenses were used only on a few shots here and there. Todd-AO films made after 1958 used a conventional flat widescreen, and resembled ordinary films, except for their greater clarity and six-track stereo sound. A variation on Todd-AO called Dimension 150 did, however, make use of Cinerama-like deeply curved screens. Only two films were made in Dimension 150 – The Bible: In the Beginning..., directed by John Huston, and Patton, starring George C. Scott. In some venues, however, Todd-AO and Dimension 150 films received their first run in Cinerama theatres in order that they be shown on a deeply curved screen – such as the first Atlanta showings of The Sound of Music.

Todd-AO and roadshows
Todd-AO films were closely associated with what was called roadshow exhibition. At the time, before multiplex theatres became common, most films opened at a large single screen theatre in the downtown area of each large city before eventually moving on to neighborhood theatres. With the roadshow concept, a film would play, often in 70 mm at a movie palace downtown theatre exclusively, sometimes for a year or more. Often a "hard ticket" policy was in effect, with tickets sold for specific numbered seats, and limited showings per day. Most Todd-AO films through the late 1960s, including Those Magnificent Men in Their Flying Machines and The Sound of Music, were initially shown on a roadshow basis.

In some US cities, individual theaters were converted for use in the 1950s as dedicated Todd-AO "Cinestage" showplaces. These theaters showed exclusive roadshow engagements of Todd-AO and other 70 mm films on large, deeply curved screens. They included the Rivoli Theatre in New York City, the Cinestage Theatre in Chicago and Hunt's Cinestage Theatre in Columbus, Ohio.

The roadshow era ended in the early 1970s, although a very few films (among them Gandhi) were shown in roadshow format after that.

Todd-AO 35
In the 1970s, under the leadership of Dr. Richard Vetter, Todd-AO made an attempt to compete with Panavision in the 35 mm motion picture camera rental market. The company built a series of anamorphic lenses in the 2.35:1 scope format, and owned several camera bodies (Mitchell and Arriflex) that they would provide with the lens package. Films produced in Todd-AO 35 include Conquest of the Planet of the Apes, Conan the Barbarian, Mad Max, Dune and Logan's Run.

By the mid 1980s the venture was moribund, and was abandoned. Eventually all of the Todd-AO cameras and lenses, both 35 mm and 65 mm (70 mm), were sold to Cinema Products in Los Angeles. Cinema Products is now defunct.

Timeline
 1953: Mike Todd, the Naify brothers and the American Optical Company form a joint venture called Todd-AO for the purpose of developing and distributing a large film format presentation system which incorporates a wide, curved screen with multi-channel sound.
 1955 & 56: Mike Todd produced two films which feature the new Todd-AO system.
 1958: Mike Todd is killed in a plane crash. 
 1960s and 1970s: Although several blockbuster films were produced using the Todd-AO or Panavision versions of the 5-perf 70 mm format, market penetration of the Todd-AO system lost momentum, and is overtaken by the development of IMAX in the 1970s.
 1986: Acquired Glen Glenn Sound.
1987: Acquired the Trans/Audio sound studio in New York City
 1994: Acquired Film-Video Masters, Inc.
1995: Acquired Skywalker Sound South studios from George Lucas in Santa Monica
1995: Purchased Chrysalis Television Facilities and its satellite transmission from the Chrysalis Group
1996: Acquired Pacific Title and Art which brought specialization in the production of film, title, and optical special effects as well as digital services for motion pictures 
1996: Acquired Editworks, which specialized in commercial advertising in Atlanta, expanded Todd-AO’s geographic connections
1997: Acquired International Video Conversions in Burbank
1997: Purchased Hollywood Digital Company 
1998: Acquired Pascal Video to address the potential market in Digital Versatile Disk (DVD) technology. Todd-AO Video Services DVD, Inc. was created for the conversion of film and video content to DVD format
1999:  Acquired SoundOne Corporation in New York City
1999: Purchased 50% of 103 Estudio in Barcelona
 1999: Todd-AO acquired by Liberty Media Group, a division of AT&T, and became part of its Liberty Livewire entity.
 2002: Liberty Livewire renamed Ascent Media Group.
 2005: Ascent Media Group spun-off from owner, Liberty Media, into Discovery Holding Company.
 2007: Discovery Holding Company announced a restructuring plan where it intended to spin-off its interest in Ascent Media and combine Discovery Communications with Advance/Newhouse Communications into a new holding company.  The reorganization was completed on September 17, 2008.
 2007: The Todd-AO Scoring Stage closed.
 2008: "Creative Sound Services" division of Ascent Media Group was spun-off from Discovery Holding Company to create CSS Studios, LLC, to become a wholly owned subsidiary of Discovery Communications. This transaction included the assets of Todd-AO, Soundelux, Sound One, POP Sound, Modern Music, Soundelux Design Music Group and The Hollywood Edge.
 2012: CSS Studios, LLC is acquired by Empire  InvestmentHoldings, which files bankruptcy for Todd Soundelux in May 2014.
2014: (May) Todd Soundelux files for bankruptcy, closing its Hollywood and Santa Monica facilities.
2014: (November) Sounddogs acquires the Todd-Soundelux Trademarks (Todd AO and Soundelux) and Copyrights (Sound Effects Library)

Films produced in 70 mm Todd-AO
(films photographed in Todd-AO 35 not included)
Oklahoma! (1955) – 30 frame/s (also photographed in CinemaScope for conventional distribution)
Around the World in Eighty Days (1956) – 30 frame/s (also photographed in Todd-AO 24 frames/s and reduction-printed for conventional CinemaScope distribution)
The Miracle of Todd-AO (1956) – 30 frame/s; short subject
South Pacific (1958) – this and all subsequent were 24 frame/s
The March of Todd-AO (1958) – short subject
Porgy and Bess (1959)
Can-Can (1960)
The Alamo (1960)
Scent of Mystery (1960) – credited as Todd 70
Cleopatra (1963)
Man in the 5th Dimension (1964) – NYC World's Fair short subject
The Sound of Music (1965)
Those Magnificent Men in Their Flying Machines (1965)
The Agony and the Ecstasy (1965)
The Bible: In the Beginning (1966) – Dimension 150 variant
Doctor Dolittle (1967)
Star! (1968)
Hello, Dolly! (1969)
Krakatoa, East of Java (1969) – selected scenes (see Super Panavision 70) – presented in 70 mm Cinerama
Airport (1970)
Patton (1970) – Dimension 150 variant
The Last Valley (1971)
Baraka (1992)

Awards

Feature film

Television

See also
 70 mm film
 Philips DP70 (the theater projector developed as part of the Todd-AO system)
 Cinerama
 Glen Glenn Sound
 List of 70 mm films
 List of film formats
 Super Panavision 70
 Super Technirama 70
 Ultra Panavision 70

References

External links
 Todd-AO official site
 Internet Movie Database listing of films shot in Todd-AO
 Todd-AO information from in70 mm.com
 WideScreen Museum history of Todd-AO
 Todd: "Cinerama outa one hole"
 Journal of Film Preservation N° 56 on page 19:
 The history of the Todd-AO projector, known as the DP70

Mass media companies established in 1953
Film and video technology
Motion picture film formats
1953 establishments in California
Recipients of the Scientific and Technical Academy Award of Merit